Forestville Airport  is located in Forestville, Quebec, Canada.

References

Registered aerodromes in Côte-Nord